Abraham ibn Akra or Abraham ben Solomon Akra was a Jewish-Italian scholar and editor of scientific works who lived at the end of the 16th century. He edited the work Me-Harere Nemerim (Venice, 1599), a collection of several methodological essays and commentaries on various Talmudic treatises. Akra is the author of a methodological treatise on the Midrash Rabbot, which Isaiah Horowitz (של"ה) embodied in his work Shene Luḥot ha-Berit (ed. Amsterdam, p. 411), without credit. The same thing occurs in the Vilna edition of the Midrash Rabbot, where Akra's treatise is reproduced from the Shene Luḥot ha-Berit. Akra's work appeared originally as an appendix to the Arze Lebanon, a collection of kabalistic essays, Venice, 1601. Abraham makes there the interesting statement that he saw in Egypt the manuscript of the Midrash Abkir. This is the last trace of the existence of that small midrash.

Jewish Encyclopedia bibliography 
Michael, Or ha-Ḥayyim, No. 247.

External links 
Jewish Encyclopedia article for Abraham ibn Akra by Louis Ginzberg.

Jewish Italian writers
16th-century Italian Jews
Year of birth unknown
Year of death unknown